Street Boss   (foaled 31 March 2004) is an American Thoroughbred racehorse that won the 2008 Triple Bend Handicap and Bing Crosby Handicap.  He stands as a shuttle stallion for Darley Stud, the global breeding operation of Godolphin.

Background

Street Boss was bred in Kentucky and foaled on the 31 March 2004.  He was sired by champion sire Street Cry, whose progeny includes over 130 stakes-winners.   Street Boss was sold for $300,000 as a yearling at Keeneland in September 2005.

Racing career

On 2 September 2007, Street Boss won on debut at Del Mar as a three-year-old.

As a four-year-old Street Boss went on a winning streak of 5 races in succession, culminating in duel Grade One victories in the Triple Bend and Bing Crosby Handicap's.

Street Boss had his last ever run in the 2008 Breeders' Cup Sprint where he finished third behind Midnight Lute.

Stud career

Street Boss was retired to Darley Stud and has since performed as a shuttle stallion in the United States, Europe, Australia and New Zealand.

Notable progeny

Street Boss has currently sired 8 Grade/Group One winners:

c = colt, f = filly, g = gelding

Pedigree

References 

Racehorses bred in Kentucky
Racehorses trained in the United States
2004 racehorse births